Chris O'Neil defeated Betsy Nagelsen in the final, 6–3, 7–6(7–3) to win the women's singles tennis title at the 1978 Australian Open.

Evonne Goolagong was the reigning champion, but did not compete this year.

Seeds
The seeded players are listed below. Chris O'Neil is the champion; others show the round in which they were eliminated.

 Sue Barker (quarterfinals)
 Renáta Tomanová (quarterfinals)
 Beth Norton (second round)
 Amanda Tobin (first round)
 Renee Blount (second round)
 Cynthia Doerner (first round)
Withdrawn
 Betsy Nagelsen (finalist)

Qualifying

Draw

Finals

Earlier rounds

Section 1

Section 2

References

External links
 1978 Australian Open – Women's draws and results at the International Tennis Federation

Women's singles
Australian Open (tennis) by year – Women's singles
1978 in Australian women's sport
1979 in Australian women's sport
1979 WTA Tour